Milendella is a locality on the plains to the east of the Mount Lofty Ranges in South Australia. It was once a stop on the Sedan railway line. The name Milendella was approved by the state Nomenclature Committee in 1917 in advance of the railway opening in 1919. The name was the native name of Emu Creek which runs through the locality.

Milendella was first settled by German immigrant families in the 1880s. The Lutheran church was built in the 1890s. The town once had a church, general store, post office, school and railway station.

Zion Evangelical Lutheran Church continues to meet monthly.

Milendella includes the former Government Town of Bonython which was surveyed in 1890 and named after Sir John Langdon Bonython.

References

Towns in South Australia